Armus may refer to:
Alien life form in "Skin of Evil", an episode of Star Trek: The Next Generation
Sidney Armus (1924–2002), American actor
Burton Armus (born 1934), American police detective, actor, writer and television producer

See also 
 Armas (disambiguation)